Starman is a 1984 American science fiction romance drama film directed by John Carpenter that tells the story of a non-corporeal alien who has come to Earth and cloned a human body (portrayed by Jeff Bridges) in response to the invitation found on the gold phonograph record installed on the Voyager 2 space probe. The original screenplay was written by Bruce A. Evans and Raynold Gideon, with Dean Riesner making uncredited re-writes.

The film received positive reviews but faltered in its initial box office debut. Bridges was nominated for the Academy Award for Best Actor for his role. It inspired the short-lived Starman television series in 1986.

Plot

The Voyager 2 space probe, launched in 1977, carries a gold phonographic disk with a message of peace, inviting alien civilizations to visit Earth. The probe is intercepted by an alien planet, which then sends a small scout vessel to establish first contact with Earth. Instead of greeting the alien craft, the U.S. government shoots it down. Crashing in Chequamegon Bay, Wisconsin, the lone alien occupant, looking like a floating ball of glowing energy, finds the home of recently widowed Jenny Hayden. The alien uses a lock of hair from her deceased husband, Scott, to clone a body for himself as Jenny watches in terror. The alien "Starman" has seven small silver spheres with him which provide energy to perform miraculous feats. He uses the first to send a message to his people stating that Earth is hostile and his spacecraft has been destroyed. He arranges to rendezvous with them in three days' time. He then uses the second sphere to create a holographic map of the United States, coercing Jenny into taking him to the rendezvous in Arizona.

Initially hostile to and frightened of him, Jenny attempts to escape. Having a very basic understanding of the English language from the Voyager 2 disk, the Starman learns to communicate with Jenny and assures her that he means no harm. He explains that if he does not reach the rendezvous point, Arizona's Barringer Crater, in three days, he will die. Sympathetic but still wary, Jenny teaches him how to drive a car and use credit cards, so he can continue the journey alone. When he resurrects a dead deer, she is deeply moved and decides to stay with him. The authorities pursue the pair across the country. A police officer shoots and critically wounds Jenny. To escape, the Starman crashes their car into a gas tanker and uses another sphere to protect them from the explosion. They take refuge in a mobile home that is being towed. He uses another silver sphere to heal Jenny. After being assured that Jenny will recover, he proceeds to hitchhike toward Arizona without her, but Jenny manages to catch up to him while he and his driver are stopped at a roadblock. Reunited, they hitchhike together, resuming their journey towards the crater.

Later, while stowing away on a railroad boxcar, they have sex. The Starman tells Jenny, "I gave you a baby tonight." Jenny explains that she is infertile and cannot have children, but he assures her that she is pregnant. He explains that Scott is the posthumous father, as Starman used Scott's DNA to clone himself. As a child also of Starman, their son will possess all the Starman's knowledge and will grow up to be a teacher. Starman offers to stop the pregnancy if she wishes, but Jenny joyfully embraces him, accepting the gift. They accidentally travel too far on the train and arrive in Las Vegas. Jenny loses her wallet. The Starman uses one of their last quarters in a slot machine, which he manipulates to win the $500,000 jackpot. They buy a new car to complete their journey to Arizona.

National Security Agency director George Fox learns that the Starman's flight trajectory, prior to being shot down, was to the Barringer Crater and arranges to have the Army capture the Starman, dead or alive. SETI scientist Mark Shermin, another government official involved in the case, criticizes Fox's heavy-handed approach and reminds him that the Starman was invited to Earth. Appalled to learn that Fox is planning to vivisect the alien, Shermin then resolves to help the Starman escape rather than let Fox capture him.

Jenny and the slowly dying Starman reach the crater as Army helicopters pursue them. Just as they are surrounded, a large, spherical spaceship appears and descends into the crater. Light surrounds the couple and the Starman is fully healed immediately. As he prepares to leave, he tells Jenny he will never see her again. Jenny asks him to take her with him, but he says she would die on his world. He then gives her his last silver sphere, telling her that their son will know what to do with it. Jenny watches as the ship departs.

Cast

Production
Starman spent five years in development at Columbia. The original script by Bruce A. Evans and Raynold Gideon was purchased by the studio at the urging of executive producer Michael Douglas, shortly before it optioned Steven Spielberg's Night Skies. Screenwriter Dean Riesner came onto the project in late 1981 after director Mark Rydell left the project due to artistic differences with Douglas. Riesner worked on seven rewrites of Starman with six different directors, but did not receive screen credit because, according to him, "the Writers Guild, in their infinite wisdom, decided I didn't contribute 50 percent of the screenplay." Other uncredited writers who worked on the script were Edward Zwick and Diane Thomas. Columbia abandoned Night Skies, with a similar plot to Starman, on the grounds that it is a more Disney-like story aimed at children, whereas Starman was for a more mature audience. Night Skies was eventually retitled E.T. the Extra-Terrestrial, which became the highest-grossing film of its time, upon which Riesner commented, "Goes to show how wrong you can be in this business."

According to Riesner, producers at Columbia were concerned at the initial box office returns for E.T., because Starman (while Riesner was working its second rewrite) was too similar. Adrian Lyne had briefly worked on the project before departing to direct Flashdance for Paramount. He was replaced by John Badham, who then left to direct WarGames as soon as he saw E.T., and concurred that the two projects were too similar. Riesner was charged with keeping Starman essentially the same while making it distinct from E.T, and would work with three subsequent directors: Tony Scott, Peter Hyams, and John Carpenter. Whereas Scott was more interested in style than narrative drive and wanted to cast Philip Anglim, and Hyams pushed for a more conventional science fiction approach, Carpenter, who was eager to shed his image as a maker of exploitative thrillers, wished to emphasize the cross-country rapport that develops between the two leads, as in The Defiant Ones, The 39 Steps, and It Happened One Night over special effects. Riesner dropped the "heavy political implications" from the script to comply with this.

Parts of the film were shot in Monument Valley, Utah.

Reception

Box office 
Starman grossed $2.9 million in its opening weekend, debuting at number 6. It was released the same week as David Lynch's film Dune and one week after the release of Peter Hyams's film 2010: The Year We Make Contact. The film grossed a total of $28.7 million from its domestic run.

Critical response 
The review aggregator Rotten Tomatoes reports an approval rating of 86% based on 35 reviews, with an average rating of 6.9/10. The site's critics consensus reads: "What initially begins as sci-fi transforms into a surprisingly sweet, offbeat drama, courtesy of John Carpenter's careful direction." The aggregator Metacritic gives the film a score of 71 out of 100, based on seven critics, indicating "generally favorable reviews".

Roger Ebert gave the film three stars out of four and wrote "Starman contains the potential to be a very silly movie, but the two actors have so much sympathy for their characters that the movie, advertised as space fiction, turns into one of 1984's more touching love stories." In a highly positive review praising the film along with its actors and director, Janet Maslin stated "If Starman doesn't make a major difference in Jeff Bridges's career, Mr. Bridges is operating in the wrong galaxy." Duane Byrge wrote for The Hollywood Reporter that the film had "an amusing and appealing storyline" and a "winning performance" by Jeff Bridges, describing it as "an often on-target look at current American culture". However, he found the script "one-dimensional in certain plotting aspects, especially in regard to the single-minded military forces", but praised it for "an uplifting and humane message" and Carpenter for "fluid storytelling", and commended the "evocative score and the special visual effects" as "first-rate".

Mark Harrison wrote for Den of Geek that it was "a classic sci-fi date movie" and "not only an outlier in [Carpenter's] body of work but also an inarguable product of his direction". According to Harrison, Carpenter had taken "a potential E.T. knock-off and turned it into a modern spin on a more classical Hollywood genre", and praised it for a "canny reversal of gender roles" where "Bridges is the naïve ingenue who knows nothing about the world (or our world, anyway) and Allen is the more cynical character who is pulled into a cross-country adventure with him." He added "the film really lives or dies on the chemistry of the leads. Fortunately, Bridges and Allen are both on spectacular form here", believing that Karen Allen's portrayal "might be her best ever performance." He concluded that "Starman is a bittersweet, genre-bending date movie that really ought to be celebrated as one of the more lovable entries in the John Carpenter canon."

Alan Jones awarded it four stars out of five for Radio Times, arguing that "John Carpenter's religious sci-fi parable has as much heart and emotion as it does special effects, and gives Oscar-nominated Jeff Bridges a real chance to stretch his acting talent." He described it as "funny, suspenseful and moving" and concluded that "this engaging space odyssey is one of Carpenter's best efforts." Halliwell's Film Guide was less positive, describing it as a "derivative but eccentric science-fiction fantasy with lapses of narrative and a general attempt to make the love story predominant over the hardware". The review by Time Out called it "a rather lame sci-fi love story" which "lacks the drive, energy and surprise which one associates with Carpenter." It continued "The best special effects are in the first five minutes. Thereafter, it's all rather predictable. The normally excellent Bridges shuffles his way through a robotic performance as though he's just been unplugged, and the film's (very) basic gag – his naïve response to what he experiences – wears thin pretty quick." Colin Greenland reviewed Starman for Imagine magazine, and stated that it "starts well, with engaging performances from Karen Allen as the woman trying not to go crazy and Jeff Bridges as the man in the borrowed body. But then director John Carpenter changes his mind, and turns it into an irritatingly soft-headed love story. What a waste of a promising idea."

Awards and honors
Jeff Bridges was nominated for the Academy Award for Best Actor, making Starman the only film by John Carpenter to receive an Academy Award nomination. Bridges was also nominated for the Golden Globe Award for Best Actor – Drama and was awarded the Saturn Award for Best Actor. Karen Allen also received a nod for Best Actress from the Academy of Science Fiction, Fantasy & Horror Films. The film itself was nominated Best Science Fiction Film. Jack Nitzsche received a Golden Globe nomination for his score.

The film was nominated for, but does not appear on the following lists:
 2002: AFI's 100 Years...100 Passions – Nominated
 2008: AFI's 10 Top 10: Nominated Science Fiction Film

Soundtrack

The soundtrack to Starman was released on December 14, 1984. The album also contains a rendition of "All I Have to Do Is Dream" performed by stars Jeff Bridges and Karen Allen.

Home media
The film was released Blu-ray on August 11, 2009.

Remake
In April 2016, The Hollywood Reporter reported that Shawn Levy will direct and produce a remake written by Arash Amel. Michael Douglas, who was a producer of the original, is also on board to produce, while Dan Cohen and Robert Mitas are executive producing, and Matt Milam and Adam North are overseeing the project for Columbia. In 2021, Levy declared the remake to be improbable, as he could not find a good draft that was worthy of adaptation.

In popular culture
The City of Prague Philharmonic Orchestra covered "Starman Leaves (End Title)" for their 2005 cover compilation album, The Science Fiction Album. The 2010 single "Symphonies" by Dan Black, and its remix featuring Kid Cudi, sampled CoPPO's cover of the song. At the end of the music video the lead character is beamed away by a bright circular spaceship, similar to the manner in which the Starman from the film departs Earth. The music video itself contains scenes which pay homage to several Jeff Bridges films, including Tron and King Kong.

See also
 Starman (TV series)

References

External links
 
 
 
 
 
 LA Weekly interview with John Carpenter on the making of Starman

1984 films
1980s romance films
1980s science fiction films
Alien visitations in films
American science fiction romance films
Columbia Pictures films
Films adapted into television shows
Films directed by John Carpenter
Films scored by Jack Nitzsche
Films set in Wisconsin
Films set in Arizona
Films shot in Colorado
Films shot in Iowa
Films shot in Tennessee
Films shot in the Las Vegas Valley
Films shot in Utah
1980s English-language films
1980s American films
Films shot in Monument Valley